is a Japanese politician serving in the House of Representatives in the Diet (national legislature) as a member of the Liberal Democratic Party. A native of Muraoka, Hyōgo and graduate of Meiji University he was elected for the first time in 2005.

References

External links
  Official website in Japanese.

Living people
1952 births
Liberal Democratic Party (Japan) politicians
Members of the House of Representatives (Japan)
21st-century Japanese politicians